The Texas Rodeo Cowboy Hall of Fame is a museum and hall of fame in Fort Worth, Texas, dedicated to the sport of rodeo.

History
This hall of fame was founded by Johnny Boren. Also contributing to the foundation were a group of Belton, Texas, businessmen. At the time of the foundation, Boren was the manager of the Lone Star Circuit of the Professional Rodeo Cowboys Association. Boren was also a businessman and former bull rider. He founded the Old Timers Rodeo Association. They first located the hall of fame in several businesses in Belton lastly moving to the Bell County Expo Center. Eventually, they moved the hall back to its birthplace, about a block from the Ford dealership where it was created.

Organization
The Hall of Fame is currently housed in the Cowtown Coliseum in the Fort Worth Stockyards Historic District. There is a display of over 300 pictures and biographies on the walls for the current inductees, who are Texas rodeo cowboys, cowgirls, organizations, and livestock. The hall of fame's goal is to preserve the history and tradition of the cowboy and cowgirl. Individuals are inducted annually. World champions are inducted of course, but also less familiar individuals. More than 500,000 people visit the hall annually. New programs recently added to the hall include the Promoting the Future program with a scholarship for high school individuals to help them attend college and the Horizon Honoree program to recognize exceptional high school and college rodeo performers.

Induction
An induction ceremony takes place each year, usually on the first Saturday in April, at River Ranch in the Fort Worth Stockyards Historic District. The weekend also includes a golf tournament on Thursday, and a Rodeo Reunion gathering and unveiling of plaques at Cowtown Coliseum on Friday afternoon. In 2005, the Hall of Fame inducted as members the former rodeo performer and promoter Dan Taylor of Doole, and his wife, Berva.

Hall of Fame Inductees 

Sources:

References

External links 
 OfficialSite

Museums in Fort Worth, Texas
American West museums in Texas
Sports museums in Texas
Cowboy halls of fame
Halls of fame in Texas